Llanishen High School is an English-medium secondary school based in Llanishen, Cardiff, Wales. It has approximately 1700 students, making it the largest single-site secondary school in Cardiff. It also has a sixth form college for 16–18 year olds.

History 
In 2016, Llanishen High School was rated "adequate" by Estyn and put into monitoring. It was removed from monitoring later the same year, and has made significant progress since then. Part of this has been attributed to a newer, smarter uniform policy. This uniform policy was heavily disputed at first, with a petition of over 200 signing a petition opposing the changes due to cost and practicality.

In 2019, the school notably got its own therapy dog, Daisy, a Cavalier King Charles Spaniel. She is meant to help with student stress and anxiety, and also to improve behaviour. This followed a similar move by Bishop of Llandaff Church in Wales High School. This inspired other schools in Cardiff to provide similar student support.

School buildings

Much of the school was built during the 1950s, but some buildings (the new Science block for example) were built in later decades. The School has a hockey pitch, basketball court, indoor tennis courts, fields for athletics/cricket/football and rugby and enters teams in a variety of competitions - usually competing against local schools. A new D.T. block has been built. The LRC (Learning Resource Centre/Library) and Sports Hall have been renovated.

In Autumn 2018, work on a new 3G pitch was completed on the site of the grass banks. New changing rooms and a clubhouse for Llanishen RFC have also been erected, in place of the indoor tennis facility, as part of an ongoing partnership between the school and the local rugby club.

Council

The School has a student council formed in mid-2006. The council has been proven a success in having key input in developing several areas of the school. Examples of this include; new bike racks, re-development of the West-Wing corridor area, improving canteen food through the newly found SNACK committee. Current projects include a revamp of the school website, re-development of the East-Wing corridor area and improving the schools Quad area. 

The council has a partnership with Sainsbury's in Thornhill, Cardiff. The superstore provides sponsorship to the newly produced school newspaper and offers cash prizes for several competitions run by the school.

Media
'LHTV' was a small TV Station based at the school. The station was involved in an award won at the European Languages Awards 2007 when the Modern Foreign Languages Department won the award for the best "Foreign Language Film". 

The station had also previously filmed the annual European Day of Languages held in Cardiff every year which the school itself ran. It was later dissolved.

In 2022, school TV station 'One Llanishen' was founded. Its first production was the Transition Video 2022. Currently, the station is working on 'Time Chronicles', a sci-fi thriller written, filmed, acted and edited by the pupils. It is set to launch in early-mid 2023.

Sport
The school has teams participating in local, regional and national competitions in a variety of sports. The school enjoys particular success in rugby, with the First XV Boys rugby team winning the Welsh Cup in 2014, 2015 and 2016, as well as reaching the final in 2011.

Notable former pupils

 Tom Cullen, actor and writer whose roles include Jonas in Black Mirror, drug trafficker Yoram in Banged Up Abroad, and Anthony Foyle (the Viscount Gillingham) on Downton Abbey.
 Joe Jacobson, professional footballer for Wycombe Wanderers, as well as former captain of the Wales U21 team and the Cardiff City reserve team.
 John Tabatabai, professional poker player who was the runner-up to Norwegian poker player Annette Obrestad in the first World Series of Poker Europe Main Event.
 Neil Slatter, former professional footballer who began his career with Bristol Rovers in 1980, where he remained for five years before moving on to Oxford United.
 Ruth Picardie, journalist and editor who worked for The Guardian and The Independent newspapers, with contributions to other publications, such as the New Statesman, and author of Before I Say Goodbye, her memoir of living with breast cancer.
 Wade Barrett, wrestler.
 Rabbi Matondo, professional footballer for Scottish Premiership and UEFA Champions League side Rangers F.C.. He has also represented his national side Wales, making his debut in a loss to Albania in Autumn 2018.

References

External links
2009 Estyn Inspection Report

2016 Estyn Inspection Report

2016 Estyn Monitoring Report

Secondary schools in Cardiff
Llanishen, Cardiff